The Milltown Public Schools are a comprehensive community public school district, serving students in pre-kindergarten through eighth grade from Milltown, in Middlesex County, New Jersey, United States.

As of the 2020–21 school year, the district, comprised of two schools, had an enrollment of 777 students and 70.2 classroom teachers (on an FTE basis), for a student–teacher ratio of 11.1:1.

The district is classified by the New Jersey Department of Education as being in District Factor Group "FG", the fourth-highest of eight groupings. District Factor Groups organize districts statewide to allow comparison by common socioeconomic characteristics of the local districts. From lowest socioeconomic status to highest, the categories are A, B, CD, DE, FG, GH, I and J.

For ninth through twelfth grades, public school students attend Spotswood High School in Spotswood as part of a sending/receiving relationship with the Spotswood Public Schools, which also serves students from Helmetta. In 2013, Milltown and Spotswood had discussions of expanding the partnership between the two districts beyond the sending relationship. As of the 2020–21 school year, the high school had an enrollment of 692 students and 57.0 classroom teachers (on an FTE basis), for a student–teacher ratio of 12.1:1.

Schools
Schools in the district (with 2020–21 enrollment data from the National Center for Education Statistics) are:
Elementary school
Parkview School with 323 students in grades PreK-3
Eric Siegel, Principal
Middle school
Joyce Kilmer School with 449 students in grades 4-8; 370 students
William Veit, Principal

Central administration
Core members of the district's administration are:
Dr. Stephanie A. Brown, Superintendent
Norma Tursi, Business Administrator / Board Secretary

Board of education
The district's board of education, comprised of nine members, sets policy and oversees the fiscal and educational operation of the district through its administration. As a Type II school district, the board's trustees are elected directly by voters to serve three-year terms of office on a staggered basis, with three seats up for election each year held (since 2012) as part of the November general election. The board appoints a superintendent to oversee the district's day-to-day operations and a business administrator to supervise the business functions of the district.

References

External links
Milltown Public Schools
 
School Data for the Milltown Public Schools, National Center for Education Statistics

Milltown, New Jersey
New Jersey District Factor Group FG
School districts in Middlesex County, New Jersey